Baxter Aviation was an airline based in Nanaimo, British Columbia, Canada, founded by Tom and Linda Baxter which operated scheduled and chartered services throughout the Pacific Northwest with DHC-2 Beaver float-equipped aircraft. In 2007, Baxter Aviation was taken over by West Coast Air.

History 
The airline was founded in 1985 by Tom and Linda Baxter and began with a single Cessna 185. Shortly after, the Baxters received a class 3 scheduled license to provide services between downtown Vancouver and Vancouver International Airport to downtown Nanaimo on Vancouver Island. Baxter operated with the IATA code 6B.

On April 20, 2007, West Coast Air completed the purchase of Baxter Aviation.

Services 
Baxter Aviation operated services between Vancouver Harbour Water Aerodrome and Vancouver International Water Airport to Nanaimo Harbour Water Aerodrome.

Fleet 
The Baxter Aviation fleet consisted of 9 de Havilland Canada DHC-2 Beaver aircraft.

See also 
 List of defunct airlines of Canada

External links
Baxter Aviation

Defunct airlines of Canada
Airlines established in 1985
Airlines disestablished in 2007
Companies based in British Columbia
Nanaimo
Defunct seaplane operators
1985 establishments in British Columbia